William Cooper was the  speaker of 15th Legislative Assembly of Prince Edward Island from 1839 to 1842. He was the speaker during all the five sessions of the assembly.

References

Speakers of the Legislative Assembly of Prince Edward Island
Members of the Legislative Council of Prince Edward Island
19th-century Canadian politicians
Colony of Prince Edward Island people
Year of birth uncertain
Year of death uncertain